Allen is an unincorporated community in Quitman County, Mississippi. Allen is located on the Tallahatchie River, southeast of Lambert.

References

Unincorporated communities in Quitman County, Mississippi
Unincorporated communities in Mississippi